In Breton tradition, a coiffe bigoudène is a women's coif worn with traditional Breton costumes. By extension, the women wearing the coif and the costume associated with it are also called bigoudènes. The coif is about 30 cm high, and up to 40 cm in Penmarc'h.

The bigoudène coif is worn by the women of the Bigouden Country (Breton: Bro-Vigoudenn; French: Le Pays Bigouden) historically known as "Cap Caval" and located along the Bay of Audierne (Bro Kernev), south-west of Quimper, Brittany. They have been officially based in the French departement of Finistère since 1790.

The term bigoudène should not be confused with "bigoudénnie", the geographical concentration of these women, and with the Bigouden region.

Etymology 
The first attestation of the term bigoudène being used in the French language (from Breton: bigoudenn) was in 1881 in the Revue des deux Mondes (French: [ʁəvy de dø mɔ̃d], Review of the Two Worlds). It had been used in the Breton language around 1830 through the meaning: "headdress of linen or cotton worn in the region of Pont-l'Abbé". It is related to the terms bigoudi (stalk around which women wrap their hair), bigot (part of the racage from a yard on top of a traditional square rigged ship) and bigue (kind of pulley, type of spar used as a crane).

Literary quotes 
 "Very strong, vaulted, thick waist, they [the women from Plomeur] wear three skirts of cloth superimposed (...) and they are wearing the strange bigoudène coif, kind of variegated headband that hides their ears and lets see from behind, their hair up". ― (François Coppée, Prose, Mon franc-parler I, 1894, p. 115)
 "But nothing could stop the stubborn bigoudène". ― (Hervé Bazin, 1956, page 37).

History 

Contrary to a widespread legend encapsulating the headdresses’ size as a response to the cut steeples cut during the Revolt of the papier timbré (anti-fiscal revolt in the west of Ancien Régime France, reign of Louis XIV from April to September 1675); the bigoudène headdress only became really high in the twentieth century, especially in the Interwar period (November 1918 - September 1939) where it gained a centimeter per year. The maximum height of the cap is reached at the end of the Second World War, when the Breton costume started to become old-fashioned.

The high headdress is for ceremonies or states of mourning: the everyday headdress worn during the daily work is a simple black velvet ribbon around the comb and behind which one concealed the chignon. In 1977, 31% of women over 47 years old wore the headdress. This figure drastically decreased to only 500 women of all ages) in 1993. In 2011, Maria Lambour is one of the last women to wear this headdress on a daily basis. Today it is worn only during cultural events and by rare women on an almost daily basis.

On June 11, 2018, the then doyenne (eldest) of the Bigoudènes Marie Pochat died at the age of 102 in her native Brittany. She was one of the few last irreducible Bretons still wearing the headdress. Born on February 29, 1916, in Léchiagat (now Treffiagat)  in the Bigouden country, Marie Pochat regularly wore the headdress since the age of 12 years old. "Without this headdress, I feel that I miss something," she told France 3 Brittany on the occasion of the celebration of her centenary in 2016. Only a handful of Bretons still wear this lace headdress, a true symbol of Brittany first appeared in 1747. In 2015, the Museum of Brittany had hosted an exhibition by photographer  showing the considerable richness and diversity of Breton headdresses.

Sartorial aspects 
The confection of the bigoudènes' traditional costume is recognized as a landmark of French sartorial heritage and high craftsmanship. The oldest known Bigoudène headdress dates back to 1830; still ample, the headdress largely covers the hair; limited to a small rectangle, the embroidery is nascent. It is exhibited at the Bigouden Museum in Pont-l'Abbé. One of the most important sartorial events for bigoudènes is the "Feast of Embroiderers" (French: Fête des Brodeuses) taking place every year in July in Pont-l'Abbé, Finistère, Brittany.

In the arts 
Numerous artists immortalized the bigoudènes such as:
 Henri Guinier (1867- 1927)
 François Hippolyte Lalaisse (1810-1884)
 Henri Delavallée (1860-1943)
 Georges A. L. Boisselier (1876-1943)
  (1825-1893)
 Georges Lacombe (1868-1916)
 Lucien Simon (1861- 1945)
 Joseph-Félix Bouchor (1853-1937)
 Émile Malo-Renault (1870-1938)
 Paul Gauguin (1848–1903)
 Pascal Dagnan-Bouveret (1852–1929)

In popular culture 
In the French-speaking world, since the 1970s, television commercials from Breizh Cola and most importantly the French food industry company "" have been portraying elderly women dressed as Bigoudènes while shouting "Tipiak, Pirates!". This famous slogan propelled the term "" to become synonymous with "hacker" in web communities and now refers to hackers or counterfeiters.

The sticker made by the textile enterprise  symbolizing a small figure wearing a bigoudène headdress is stuck on more than 1.5 million cars across the world as of July 2011 and has become a popular symbol of recognition for Bretons.

Pâtisserie 
The Bigoudène briochée (Brioched Bigoudène) is a pâtisserie popularized during the ' centenary in Loctudy. It is composed of a raised dough wrapped around a cylinder and cooked on a spit and slowly browned. It is sold on city markets around the bigoudénnie and most preponderantly in Locronan regularly elected "one of the most beautiful villages in France". There are two kinds of those pastry headdresses: a salted one with emmenthal and black olives and the other ones, sweet, covered with sugar or chocolate. The idea was partly inspired by the Eastern countries (Romania, Hungary) where they are very fond of this type of dough put aside to rise for a moment before being put on a grill.

Sources 

Breton art
Breton-language singers
Breton culture
Brittany
French culture
Costume design
French fashion